Dattatray Dhankawade is an Indian politician. He was elected Mayor of Pune in September 2014. He negotiated the budget of the Pune Metro project with the central government during his tenure.

Dhankawade resigned as mayor and was succeeded in 2016 by Prashant Jagtap, another NCP member.

References

External links 
Dattatray Dhankawade on Twitter

Nationalist Congress Party politicians from Maharashtra
Mayors of Pune
Living people
Year of birth missing (living people)